Guermantes is a commune in the Seine-et-Marne department in the Île-de-France region in north-central France. It is located in the Val de Bussy sector of Marne-la-Vallée. As of 2012, its population was 1,191.

Demographics
Inhabitants are called Guermantais.

Schools
The town has a preschool and an elementary school in a single school group. Junior high school students attend Collège Léonard de Vinci in Saint Thibault des Vignes.

Area senior high schools/sixth-form colleges:
Lycée Martin Luther King in Bussy-Saint-Georges
Lycée Emily Brontë in Lognes
Lycée Jean Moulin in Torcy

See also
Communes of the Seine-et-Marne department

References

External links

Official website 
1999 Land Use, from IAURIF (Institute for Urban Planning and Development of the Paris-Île-de-France région) 

Communes of Seine-et-Marne
Val de Bussy